Amoltepec Mixtec is a Mixtec language of Oaxaca. It is not close to other varieties of Mixtec.

References 

Mixtec language